Niamh Uí Bhriain (born 1970) is an Irish Catholic policy lobbyist, anti-abortion campaigner and Eurosceptic activist. She became prominent on the campaign against abortion in Ireland. She is the spokesperson for the anti-abortion political pressure group, the Life Institute.

Early life
Uí Bhriain was born in Cork in 1970. She first came to prominence as a co-founder and original leader of Youth Defence. She says that the inspiration behind the group came from a visit by American anti-abortion activist Joseph Scheidler to her parents' house during the 1983 referendum, during which he had brought with him graphic images of aborted foetuses. She is the daughter of Úna Bean Mhic Mhathúna, who, as Secretary of the Irish Housewives’ Union, became famous for her letter to then Taoiseach, Charles Haughey. In this letter, she denounced "career women" and called for women with children to be laid off from the Irish Public Sector. She also denounced pre-menstrual advice for children and sex education, claiming it was disgusting.

Media contributions
Uí Bhriain is a contributor to print and online media publications, submitting letters and articles on the topics and campaigns she supports. Her contributions have been published in The Irish Times, the Irish Independent and The Irish Catholic newspapers, as well as on online sites such as TheJournal.ie.

1992 general election
Uí Bhriain ran for Dáil Éireann as an independent anti-abortion candidate for Dublin Central in the 1992 general election. She gained 514 first preferences, amounting to 1.4% of the total vote, and was eliminated on the fifth count with a total of 552 votes.

Youth Defence
Uí Bhriain co-founded the anti-abortion campaign group Youth Defence.

She spoke at the Catholic event, Meeting for friendship among peoples, in Rimini, Italy, alongside the founder and leader of the far-right Forza Nuova party, Roberto Fiore,  in August 2000.

Libel action against Independent Newspapers
In 1997, Justine McCarthy alleged in the Sunday Independent that Uí Bhriain had received training from American anti-abortion group, Operation Rescue, in how to blow up abortion clinics. Uí Bhriain sued for libel, and in 2007 won an undisclosed sum from Independent Newspapers.

Same sex couples' adoption rights
Uí Bhriain was the spokesperson for the Mother and Child Campaign, which campaigned against the introduction in Ireland of the right for same-sex couples to adopt children. She was quoted as saying:
"I would not be confident in knowing that, God forbid, something happened to myself or my husband that my children would be raised in a household where there was a same-sex union. The adoption board and An Taoiseach have refused to give assurances to Irish parents that the children will not be placed in households where there are same-sex unions and will not be raised by homosexuals or lesbians."

The Mother and Child Campaign also claimed in April 2006 that children raised by same-sex couples were more likely to develop drug problems and mental health issues.

Cóir
Uí Bhriain was involved in Catholic/nationalist group Cóir during both Treaty of Lisbon campaigns (the first referendum in June 2008, which was rejected, and Lisbon II in October 2009 which was approved).

See also
Abortion in the Republic of Ireland

References

External links 

 Posts by Niamh Ui Bhriain

1970 births
Living people
Independent politicians in Ireland
Irish anti-abortion activists
Irish women activists
Politicians from County Cork
Irish eurosceptics
Irish far-right politicians
Irish Roman Catholics